Brad Bergen (born 16 March 1966) is a Canadian ice hockey player. He competed in the men's tournament at the 1998 Winter Olympics.

Career statistics

Regular season and playoffs

International

References

1966 births
Living people
Canadian ice hockey players
Olympic ice hockey players of Germany
Ice hockey players at the 1998 Winter Olympics
Sportspeople from Prince Albert, Saskatchewan